Regenesis Creation is the third album by the American symphonic black metal band Vesperian Sorrow.

About 
Lyrically,  the album is a concept album telling a fictional story of a race of beings from another world, exiled and forced with a new beginning to live on another planet. The ending song is the climax to the album when the new race conquers their enemies and are free to rule their new homeland. The album was supposed to be a 2005 release on the liner notes to the album but was not available to the public until May 2006. Before the release of the album, the band toured the UK, the USA and Canada to promote the album. The album received rave reviews from critics for a second time regarding them as "one of the best black metal bands in the country". The album is known for having a powerfully symphonic and melodic sound as well as sounding like a Scandinavian band has made the album. Most reviewers criticized the use of keyboards and thought they were overpowering the album, nonetheless it only adds to the music and gives off a powerful sensation to the music. "Quest of the Exiled" is the most requested song for the band to play live and is Donn Donni's favorite song Vesperian Sorrow has written.

Track listing
 "Intro" − 1:43	
 "Invisible Kingdom" − 7:32
 "Imprisoned in Gurdon" − 4:32
 "Regenesis Creation" − 5:54
 "Quest of the Exiled" − 7:24
 "Relinquished" − 6:39
 "The Forever Vortex" − 4:08
 "Vanquished" − 9:55

Reissue
The CD was re-released around late 2007 or 2008, with two bonus tracks. The new track listing is as follows:

 "Intro" − 1:43	
 "Invisible Kingdom" − 7:32
 "Imprisoned in Gurdon" − 4:32
 "Regenesis Creation" − 5:54
 "Quest of the Exiled" − 7:24
 "Relinquished" − 6:39
 "The Forever Vortex" − 4:08
 "Vanquished" − 9:55
 "Gates to Serpithia" − 5:03
 "Cry Lil' Sister" − 5:01 (a cover of a song from The Lost Boys soundtrack by Gerard McMahon)

Credits
 Kristoph − Drums, Keyboards
 William − Guitar
 JZD − Guitar
 Tony C. − Bass
 Donn Donni − Vocals

References

2006 albums
Concept albums
Vesperian Sorrow albums